The Sandringham Football Club, nicknamed The Zebras, is an Australian rules football club based in Melbourne which was formed in 1929 and plays in the Victorian Football League (VFL) which was formerly called the Victorian Football Association (VFA).

History
The Sandringham Football Club was admitted to the VFA competition (now VFL) for the 1929 season, though the first moves to establish a semi-professional football team from the Sandringham region began two years earlier. The club was formed in that time as a three-way merge of the existing amateur clubs in the area, Sandringham Amateurs, Black Rock FC and Hampton Amateurs. The club colours of gold, black and blue were taken from those three local teams respectively. In the clubs' first 10 years of existence, they achieved a final end of season ladder position of no higher than 5th, which came in the 1933 season.

Sandringham recorded its inaugural premiership in the 1946 season, coming from behind late in the final quarter to record a 7-point win over Camberwell in front of 30,000 spectators. Though the club struggled throughout the 1950s, it has since gone on to record 10 premierships in total, being one of the most consistent teams in the VFL, their most successful period coming in the 2000s, with 4 premierships in 10 years cementing the club as one of the premier teams in the league.

Club information
The Zebras have an alignment agreement with Australian Football League (AFL) club St Kilda which has been in place since 2009. The alignment agreement means that St Kilda listed players who are able to play but not selected for the Saints in the AFL are available to be selected for the Zebras in the VFL. The clubs extended their agreement at the end of 2016.

Previously, Sandringham had an alignment with Melbourne. Sandringham and Melbourne were the first two clubs to form an alignment. This was announced in 1999 and began in the 2000 season. The alignment had an immediate effect with Sandringham winning the premiership in 2000, and a further three premierships (2004, 2005 and 2006) were won during the affiliation.

The Zebras' home ground is and almost always has been the Beach Oval, which was renamed the Trevor Barker Beach Oval in the 1990s after the death of Trevor Barker, who had coached Sandringham to the 1992 and 1994 premierships. Only in 1966 did the club change home grounds, spending a year at the Junction Oval in St Kilda before moving back to Beach Oval ahead of the 1967 season. From the 2018 season, the club will play three of its home games each year at Moorabbin Oval, and will wear St Kilda's black, red and white guernsey in these games.

The oval has a single grandstand (the Neil Bencraft Grandstand), a southern end named after Nick Sautner (the Sautner Goal), and an administration centre (the John Mennie Administration Centre) – a social club and a capacity for 10,000. A record crowd of 18,000 attended the venue's first Sunday VFA premiership game, held between Sandringham and Port Melbourne Football Club in April 1964. A Rec Footy competition is also played at the ground.

The Sandringham Dragons play in the TAC Cup and are due to become part of the Sandringham club in the near future.

Recent VFL Seasons

Notable former players
Ian Cooper – St. Kilda. Best on ground in 1966 VFL grand final premiership.
Bob Murray - St. Kilda
 Rex Hunt - Richmond, Geelong, St Kilda (1968-1978)
Nick Sautner
Chad Liddell
Stan Tomlins
Len Toyne
 Dallas O'Brien – 1983 Stawell Gift winner
Michael Conlan
Jeff Sarau - St. Kilda
James Magner
Jack Gunston
 Max Stokes
 Des Kennedy

Honours

Club

VFA/VFL Grand Finals

VFA/VFL Club Records

Individual
JJ Liston Trophy Winners (8)
1929 – Edward Bourke
1947 – Stan Tomlins
1962 – Keith Burns
1985 – Neil McLeod
1992 – Joe Rugolo
1997 – Justin Crough
2003 – David Robbins
2005 – Paul Johnson

References

External links

 

Victorian Football League clubs
Australian rules football clubs established in 1929
Australian rules football clubs in Melbourne
1929 establishments in Australia
Italian-Australian backed sports clubs of Victoria
Australian Reserve team football
Sport in the City of Bayside